"Sobie i Wam" (from Polish: to ourselves and you) is a song recorded in Polish by Kasia Nosowska, Igor Walaszek (aka Igo), Ørganek and Krzysztof Zalewski for 2019 Męskie Granie concert tour. Song was composed by Marcin Macuk and Kasia Nosowska. It was released on May 30, 2019.

It reached number one in Poland and was awarded the platinum record certification by Polish Society of the Phonographic Industry in 2020.

Chart performance

Weekly and daily charts

Personnel 
 vocals: Katarzyna Nosowska, Tomasz Organek, Krzysztof Zalewski, Igor Walaszek
 programming, guitar, bass guitar: Marcin Macuk
 keyboard: Michał "Fox" Król
 percussion: Michał "Malina" Maliński 
 recording and mix: Arkadiusz Kopera (Black Kiss Records)
 mastering: Arkadiusz Kopera (Black Kiss Records)
 production: Marcin Macuk with help of Arkadiusz Kopera (Black Kiss Records)
 music video direction: Allan Willmann

References 

2019 songs
2019 singles
Polish-language songs
Number-one singles in Poland
Pop songs
Rock songs